Fútbol Club Juárez, commonly referred to as Bravos de Juárez, or simply as Juárez, is a Mexican football club based in the city of Ciudad Juárez, Chihuahua that currently competes in Liga MX.

History 
Futbol Club Juárez was founded in 2015 by a bi-national group of six families, two from the border city of El Paso, Texas and four from Ciudad Juárez, Mexico, making it one of the few clubs with foreign investors in Mexican football and marking the return of professional sports to Ciudad Juárez for the first time since 2012 after the previous franchise, Indios de Ciudad Juárez, was relegated from Liga MX, suffered from poor management, and was ultimately disbanded.

On June 7, 2015, it was officially announced by Ascenso MX officials that FC Juárez would compete in Ascenso MX, starting in the Apertura 2015 season.

On December 5, 2015, after a very successful beginning to the season, the team ended the 2015 campaign in second place, and FC Juárez captured its first Ascenso MX title after beating Atlante 3-1 on aggregate, thus gaining the right to play in the promotional final in the Ascenso MX. The failed to qualify for the Clausura 2016 liguilla and lost the promotional final against Necaxa.

The following season, Juárez failed to qualify for the liguilla. In the Clausura 2017 season, Juárez lost the final against Lobos BUAP with an aggregate score of 4–2.

For the 2017–18 Ascenso MX season, the league announced that Juárez was one of six Ascenso MX teams eligible for promotion to Liga MX the following season. In the Apertura 2017 season, Juárez lost their second consecutive final, against Alebrijes de Oaxaca, on penalties.

On June 11, 2019, Juárez replaced Lobos BUAP in Liga MX after the founding bi-national group purchased the struggling franchise, thus returning top-level football to Ciudad Juárez.

They have developed a friendly, cross-border rivalry with El Paso Locomotive of the USL Championship since that side began play in 2019.

Stadium

FC Juárez play their home matches at the Estadio Olímpico Benito Juárez in Ciudad Juárez, Chihuahua. Stadium attendance is capped at 19,765, and it is owned by Universidad Autónoma de Ciudad Juárez. The stadium was opened October 1980, with an inaugural match between the Mexico national team and Atlético de Madrid.

Personnel

Management

Current technical staff

Managers 
 Sergio Orduña (2015–2016)
 Miguel de Jesús Fuentes (2016–2018)
 Tomás Campos (Interim) (2018)
 Gabriel Caballero (2018–2020)
 Luis Fernando Tena (2021)
 Alfonso Sosa (2021)
 Ricardo Ferretti (2021–2022)
 Hernan Cristante (2022–present)

Players

First-team squad

On loan

Reserve teams

FC Juárez (Liga TDP)
Reserve team that plays in the Liga TDP, the fourth level of the Mexican league system.

Academia Cuextlán
Reserve team that plays in the Liga TDP, the fourth level of the Mexican league system.

Honours

 Ascenso MX
Winners: Apertura 2015

References

External links
 

 
Football clubs in Chihuahua (state)
Liga MX teams
Association football clubs established in 2015
2015 establishments in Mexico
Sports teams in Ciudad Juárez